Dante Bonfim Costa Santos (born 18 October 1983), commonly known as Dante, is a Brazilian professional footballer who plays for and captains French club Nice. Primarily a central defender, he has previously also been used as a defensive midfielder or a left back.

After emerging at Juventude, Dante went on to play for Lille, Charleroi and Standard Liège, winning the Belgian Pro League with the latter. In January 2009, he was signed by Borussia Mönchengladbach, spending two-and-a-half seasons before making a €4.7 million move to Bayern Munich, where he won nine domestic and international honours.

Dante made his international debut for Brazil in 2013, winning that year's Confederations Cup and representing the nation at the 2014 FIFA World Cup.

Club career

Early career
Dante joined Juventude's youth system in 2001 and by 2002 became a part of the club's first team setup. In 2004, he made his move to European football, signing for Lille in France. After two seasons with the club where he only featured in 12 league games, Dante moved to Belgium, signing for Charleroi in 2006. After a successful campaign in the Belgian Pro League for Charleroi where he made 27 appearances and helped the club to a respectable fifth-place finish, he moved across the country to Standard Liège.

Dante had a successful debut season with the Belgian giants, as Standard were crowned league champions; the Brazilian defender proving to be an integral member, missing just one league match. In his second season with Standard, he featured in the first 15 league matches of the campaign before interest from Germany sent the player to the Bundesliga.

Borussia Mönchengladbach

Dante joined German side Borussia Mönchengladbach on 27 December 2008 for an undisclosed transfer fee, signing a contract with the club until summer 2013. He made his debut for the club on 20 March 2009, coming on as a second-half substitute in a 1–0 loss to fellow strugglers VfL Bochum. His first goal for the club came against eventual champions VfL Wolfsburg on 11 April but it came in a losing effort as 'Gladbach fell 2–1 thanks to a late strike by defender Sascha Riether. The Brazilian scored a dramatic late winner against Energie Cottbus on 13 May, heading in a cross from winger Marko Marin to give the club a 1–0 win in the 91st minute. On the final day of the Bundesliga season on 23 May 2009, Dante scored 'Gladbach's only goal in a 1–1 draw with Borussia Dortmund, a point which meant the club avoided immediate relegation to the 2. Bundesliga.

In the opening fixture of the 2009–10 Bundesliga campaign on 9 August 2009, Dante received a red card for a bad foul as Mönchengladbach relinquished a 3–0 lead against VfL Bochum, drawing 3–3. He scored his first goal of the campaign on 31 October, heading home a corner in the 76th minute to draw the match level at 2–2 and an 82nd-minute strike from Rob Friend handed 'Gladbach a 3–2 victory over Hamburger SV. On 9 April 2010, Dante headed in a free-kick from Juan Arango to double 'Gladbach's lead, resulting in a 2–0 defeat of Eintracht Frankfurt that all but secured Bundesliga survival.

The 2010–11 campaign proved to be another difficult campaign for 'Gladbach. Dante only featured in 17 league matches as he battled against persistent injury and the club finished in 16th place, the relegation play-off spot. However, Dante did play the full 90 minutes in each play-off match against VfL Bochum as Borussia Mönchengladbach managed a 2–1 aggregate victory to remain in the German top flight for the 2011–12 season.

The following season proved much more successful as Dante featured in 38 matches in all competitions, playing the full 90 minutes in each. In January 2012, he hinted he could leave the club before his contract expired in June 2014, revealing to the press he desired to play for a top club in Germany, singling out Bayern Munich, Borussia Dortmund and Bayer Leverkusen. Dante was influential as the club made a run to the semi-finals of the DFB-Pokal where the club lost 4–2 on penalties to Bayern Munich on 21 March 2012, with Dante and Håvard Nordtveit missing their penalties to give Bayern a spot in the final with champions Borussia Dortmund.

Bayern Munich
On 26 April 2012, Dante agreed to join Bayern Munich at the start of the 2012–13 season for an estimated transfer fee of €4.7 million.

2012–13
Dante's first appearance for the club came in the DFL-Supercup on 12 August 2012, starting at centre-back in Bayern's 2–1 defeat of Borussia Dortmund. He made his Bundesliga debut for the Bavarian giants on 25 August as Bayern cruised to a 3–0 opening day victory over promoted side Greuther Fürth. He scored his first competitive goal for the team in a 5–0 thrashing of Hannover 96 on 24 November 2012. Dante made an immediate impact at Bayern, earning a place in the starting 11 and forming partnerships with the interchanging Holger Badstuber, Daniel Van Buyten and Jérôme Boateng in the centre of defence.

Following the defender's impressive start with Die Roten, head coach Jupp Heynckes told media Dante was one of the first names on the team sheet, with club captain Phillip Lahm supporting the manager's sentiments: "Dante is one of the best defenders I've ever played with." He secured his first Bundesliga title since moving to Germany after a 1–0 defeat of Eintracht Frankfurt on 6 April 2013 and was seen celebrating with the supporters in the stands following the result. In the Champions League final against Borussia Dortmund, Dante conceded a penalty for a rash challenge but failed to receive a red card in an entertaining 2–1 victory for the Bavarians.

With Dante at the heart the defence, Bayern broke records for fewest goals conceded and most clean sheets in a Bundesliga season during their treble-winning campaign.

2013–14
In new manager Pep Guardiola's first Bundesliga match, against Dante's former club Borussia Mönchengladbach, Dante scored an own goal after a mix-up with goalkeeper Manuel Neuer. The match nonetheless ended in a 3–1 victory for Bayern.

On 21 December 2013, Dante scored the opening goal as Bayern beat Raja Casablanca 2–0 in the final of the 2013 FIFA Club World Cup.

In February 2014, Dante scored three goals in the space of four matches for Bayern, in Bundesliga wins over Eintracht Frankfurt (5–0) and SC Freiburg (4–0) and a DFB-Pokal victory over Hamburger SV (5–0).

On 24 March 2014, Dante extended his contract with Bayern until June 2017.

VfL Wolfsburg
On 30 August 2015, Dante agreed to move to VfL Wolfsburg for an undisclosed transfer fee. On 13 January 2016, Dante injured teammate Bas Dost in training.

Nice
On 22 August 2016, VfL Wolfsburg announced the departure of Dante to French Ligue 1 side Nice, with which he signed a three-year contract. On 18 February 2018, he scored his first goal for the club in a 1–1 draw with Nantes.

Fan culture
In his time at Borussia Mönchengladbach, Dante was well known for his hair, becoming a cult hero with Borussia fans regularly sporting large afro wigs as an homage to their favourite player. Bayern fans continued this tradition after the defender's move to Munich.

International career

Dante received his first call-up to the Brazil national team on 21 January 2013 by returning coach Luiz Felipe Scolari to be part of the squad for a friendly against England, on 6 February at Wembley Stadium. He started the game, which England won 2–1 after goals from Wayne Rooney and Frank Lampard.

On 22 June 2013, he scored his first international goal in the final group match of the 2013 FIFA Confederations Cup, against Italy at the stroke of half-time, after coming on as a substitute for David Luiz on the 33rd minute.

Dante was a member of Brazil's squad for the 2014 FIFA World Cup, making his only appearance in the semi-final as a replacement for the suspended captain Thiago Silva, as the Seleção were defeated by Germany in a record 7–1 scoreline.

In a comment regarding the defeat, he said he has "been treated with 'less respect'".

Personal life
Dante is married and has two children. His uncle, Jonilson Veloso, is a football manager.

Career statistics

Club

International
Scores and results list Brazil's goal tally first, score column indicates score after each Dante goal.

Honours
Lille
UEFA Intertoto Cup: 2004

Standard Liège
Belgian Pro League: 2007–08
Belgian Super Cup: 2008

Bayern Munich
 Bundesliga: 2012–13, 2013–14, 2014–15
 DFB-Pokal: 2012–13, 2013–14
 DFL-Supercup: 2012
 UEFA Champions League: 2012–13
 UEFA Super Cup: 2013
 FIFA Club World Cup: 2013
Brazil
 FIFA Confederations Cup: 2013

Nice
 Coupe de France runner-up: 2021–22

Individual
 ESM Team of the Year: 2012–13

References

External links

 
 

1983 births
Living people
Sportspeople from Salvador, Bahia
Afro-Brazilian sportspeople
Brazilian footballers
Association football central defenders
Esporte Clube Juventude players
Lille OSC players
R. Charleroi S.C. players
Standard Liège players
Borussia Mönchengladbach players
FC Bayern Munich footballers
VfL Wolfsburg players
OGC Nice players
Campeonato Brasileiro Série A players
Ligue 1 players
Belgian Pro League players
Bundesliga players
UEFA Champions League winning players
Brazil international footballers
2013 FIFA Confederations Cup players
2014 FIFA World Cup players
FIFA Confederations Cup-winning players
Brazilian expatriate footballers
Brazilian expatriate sportspeople in France
Brazilian expatriate sportspeople in Belgium
Brazilian expatriate sportspeople in Germany
Expatriate footballers in France
Expatriate footballers in Belgium
Expatriate footballers in Germany